Chickerell is a town and parish in Dorset, England.  In the 2011 census the parish and the electoral ward had a population of 5,515.

History
Although Roman remains have been found, indicating that there has been settlement in the area for many years, as a modern town, Chickerell is recent and one of Dorset's newest towns. Chickerell has seen much development over the last twenty years.

Geography
The parish of Chickerell has to the west the Fleet Lagoon, East Fleet and Langton Herring. To the north-west is Portesham, to the east Weymouth, and to the south the Isle of Portland. Chesil Beach runs alongside to the west of the village which is part of the Jurassic Coast World Heritage Site. A major attraction in Chickerell is the Bennetts Water Gardens which is situated next to Chickerell Downs, a Woodland Trust wood. The Chickerell Rifle Range is also located close to the Fleet Lagoon, and is part of the Wyke Regis Training Area.

Governance
Chickerell is a civil parish. Its parish council is Chickerell Town Council. The parish is divided into two wards which contain ten councillors who are elected to the Town Council. For local government elections which take place every four years, Chickerell returns three councillors for the West Dorset District Council, 
and one councillor, for the Chickerell & Chesil Bank ward, to Dorset County Council.
Chickerell is situated within the West Dorset parliamentary constituency and the Member of Parliament is Chris Loder (Conservative) who was elected with 55.1 per cent of the vote at the 2019 general election.

Demography
At the 2011 census Chickerell's population was 5,515. Most of the residents (97.4%) considered themselves to be of a white, British ethnicity. Some 18% of the population were under 15, 2.8% were 16 or 17, 25.9% were between 18 and 44, 22.3% were 45 to 59, and the largest proportion (32.3%) were over 60 years of age. The birth rate in Chickerell exceeds the death rate and there is a net inward migration resulting in a steady increase of the population.
Chickerell's population has grown considerably since 1960. Between 1961 and 1971 it increased by 43% from 2,300 to 3,300 and has continued to grow ever since, although at a slower rate.

Economy
There are two industrial estates: Granby Industrial Estate and the Lynch Lane Industrial Estate. Blundell Harling Ltd, KEMET Electronics Corp., ASM Assembly Systems Ltd (formerly DEK Printing Machines Ltd), Tecan Components Ltd, Ultra Electronics, Weymouth Land Registry are some of the area's major employers.

Transport
The nearest coach station is at Weymouth, the nearest airport is Bournemouth Airport.

The B3157 Chickerell Road connects Chickerell to Weymouth east bound, and Bridport along the coast to the west. This is the only major road in or near the town.

References

External links
Chickerell Town Council

Towns in Dorset